Fondation Pierre Gianadda, inaugurated in 1978, administers museums and exhibitions located in Martigny, Switzerland. The permanent exhibitions include the Automobile Museum, Gallo-Roman Museum, Louis and Evelyn Franck Collection, Sculpture Park, and Chagall Court.

History

The Foundation was founded by Léonard Gianadda in memory of his younger brother Pierre, who was killed in an airplane crash in 1976.

External links
  Official Website
 

Art museums and galleries in Switzerland
Martigny
Museums in Valais
Transport museums in Switzerland
Automotive museums
Museums of ancient Rome in Switzerland
Sculpture gardens, trails and parks in Europe